Amiriyeh (also Romanized as Amīrīyeh; also known as Zorashk (Persian: زرشك) and Amiriyeh Hamzehloo) is a village in Rostaq Rural District, in the Central District of Khomeyn County, Markazi Province, Iran. At the 2006 census, its population was 387, in 89 families.

References 

Populated places in Khomeyn County